Kaveh is a Persian/Iranian name. both a given name and a surname. Notable people with the name include:

Given name:
Kaveh Alamouti, Iranian businessman
Kaveh Golestan (1950–2003), Iranian photojournalist
Kaveh Pahlavan (born 1951), American academic
Kaveh Madani (born 1981), Iranian scientist and environmentalist
Kaveh Rastegar (born 1975), American musician
Kaveh Mehrabi (born 1982), Iranian badminton player
Kaveh Rezaei (born 1992), Iranian footballer
Kaveh , Genshin Impact character

Surname:
Ardalan Shoja Kaveh (born 1963), Iranian actor
Mahmoud Kaveh (1961–1986), Iranian general
 Moshe Kaveh (born 1943), Israeli physicist and former President of Bar-Ilan University

Iranian masculine given names